Swayne Latham (January 24, 1898 – February 8, 1988) was a college football player. He was then manager of the Memphis and Little Rock offices of B. F. Goodrich Rubber Co.

Vanderbilt University
He was a prominent quarterback for Dan McGugin's Vanderbilt Commodores football teams of Vanderbilt University.

1919
In 1919, Latham was selected All-Southern by Stuart Towe, of the Knoxville Journal and Tribune.

1920
Fred Russell's Fifty Years of Vanderbilt Football gives the year of 1920 the title "One of Most Difficult Schedules." It recalls the Virginia game which ended in a tie. With two minutes left in the game, Virginia was at Vanderbilt's 5-yard line with a 4th down and 1 to go. A newspaper account recalls the play, "There leaped a streak of Gold and Black. It was Swayne Latham, crippled and confined to the sideline for the early part of the game, who intercepted the ball and broke around right end. Commodores mowed down a path as he fought his way into the clear. On he raced up the sideline, 50, 60, 70, 80 yards to Virginia's 15, where his injured ankle could no longer outdistance Virginia's defense. A tackler threw him to earth. The official called the play back. Both teams were off-side. The greatest run of the season went for naught."

Personal
He married miss Nathalie Davant on October 18, 1922.

References

External links

1898 births
1988 deaths
American football quarterbacks
All-Southern college football players
Vanderbilt Commodores football players
American football drop kickers
Players of American football from Memphis, Tennessee